Elizabeth Evans or Liz Evans may refer to:

 Lizzie Evans, American entertainer
 Elizabeth Evans, author of The Blue Hour
 Elizabeth Evans, inspiration for Dinah Morris
 Nerys Evans, Plaid Cymru politician
 Elizabeth Evans (1887–1958), English actress better known as Elisabeth Risdon
 Liz Evans (politician), candidate in the 2017 Welsh Liberal Democrats leadership election
Liz Evans (nurse), cofounder of Insite

See also
 Evans (surname)